Benhamou is a surname common in the Maghreb, meaning "son of Hayyim" or "son of Mohammed". It is typically used by Jews and to a lesser extent, Muslims. It may refer to:
Éric Benhamou (born 1955), IT professional and businessman
Daphna Poznanski-Benhamou (born 1950), French politician
Judith Benhamou-Huet, French journalist and art specialist
Lionel Benhamou (1956–1995), French guitarist
Mohamed Benhamou (born 1979), Algerian footballer

References